Andrei Semyonovich Lukanchenkov (born 7 February 1986) is a Russian professional footballer. He plays for FC Luki-Energiya Velikiye Luki.

Club career
He made his debut in the Russian Premier League in 2006 for FC Moscow.

Honours
 Russian Cup finalist: 2007.

References

1986 births
People from Velikiye Luki
Living people
Russian footballers
Russia under-21 international footballers
Association football defenders
FC Moscow players
FC SKA Rostov-on-Don players
FC Ural Yekaterinburg players
Russian Premier League players
PFC Spartak Nalchik players
FC Sodovik Sterlitamak players
FC Tosno players
FC Saturn Ramenskoye players
FC Dynamo Saint Petersburg players
FC Avangard Kursk players
FC Dynamo Bryansk players
Sportspeople from Pskov Oblast
FC Nosta Novotroitsk players